Buyang may refer to:
the Buyang people
the Buyang language